James Allen House may refer to:

James Allen House (Bon Secour, Alabama), historic house, neighbor of Allen House (Bon Secour, Alabama)
James Allen House (Lexington, Kentucky), listed on the National Register of Historic Places

See also
Allen House (disambiguation)